The Scombrinae are a subfamily of ray-finned bony fishes in the family Scombridae.  Of the 51 species in the Scombridae, 50 are in Scombrinae – with the sole exception being the butterfly kingfish, which is placed in the monospecific subfamily Gasterochismatinae.

The Scombrinae, therefore, comprise 50 extant species in 14 genera, grouped into four tribes:

 Subfamily Scombrinae
 Tribe Scombrini – mackerels
 Genus Rastrelliger
 Genus Scomber
 Tribe Scomberomorini – Spanish mackerels
 Genus Acanthocybium
 Genus Grammatorcynus
 Genus Scomberomorus
 Tribe Sardini – bonitos
 Genus Sarda
 Genus Cybiosarda
 Genus Gymnosarda
 Genus Orcynopsis
 Tribe Thunnini – tunas
 Genus Allothunnus
 Genus Auxis
 Genus Euthynnus
 Genus Katsuwonus
 Genus Thunnus

References

External links

Scombridae
Fish subfamilies
Taxa named by Charles Lucien Bonaparte